Mervyn Tuchet may refer to:
 Mervyn Tuchet, 2nd Earl of Castlehaven
 Mervyn Tuchet, 4th Earl of Castlehaven